LBD may refer to:

Arts and entertainment
The Lizzie Bennet Diaries, a web series retelling of Pride and Prejudice 
LBD teen books by Grace Dent

Education
Learning by doing, a general concept of improving performance as the accumulated amount of work in some field increases
Learning disability, frequently referred to as LBD (learning behavior disorder) by educators and workers in special education fields
Literature-based discovery, a form of knowledge extraction and automated hypothesis generation

Science and mathematics
Lanczos bidiagonalization (Lanczos algorithm) in linear algebra
Lewy body dementia, an umbrella term for dementia with Lewy bodies and Parkinson's disease dementia
Ligand binding domain, in molecular biology, part of the structure of a nuclear receptor
Literature-based discovery, a form of knowledge extraction and automated hypothesis generation

Transport
IATA airport code for Khudzhand Airport, Tajikistan
MRT station abbreviation for Labrador Park MRT station, Singapore

Weaponry
LBD-1 Gargoyle, a surface-to-air missile
Lanceur de balle de défense, French designation for flash-ball, a less lethal law enforcement weapon

Other uses
Lafayette Brawlin' Dolls, a roller derby league in Indiana, United States
Lesbian bed death, a concept proposed by sexologist Pepper Schwartz
London Beth Din, a religious court of Ashkenazi Jews
Little black dress, a semi-formal women's garment